Liam Murray (born 17 October 1997) is a Canadian rugby union player, currently playing for the Dallas Jackals of Major League Rugby (MLR) and the Canadian national team. His preferred position is prop.

Professional career
Murray signed for Major League Rugby side Houston SaberCats for the 2021 Major League Rugby season. Murray made his debut for Canada in the 2021 July rugby union tests.

Career statistics

References

External links
itsrugby.co.uk Profile

1997 births
Houston SaberCats players
Living people
Canadian rugby union players
Canada international rugby union players
Rugby union props
Toronto Arrows players
Dallas Jackals players